Affairs of Cappy Ricks is a 1937 American comedy-drama film directed by Ralph Staub and starring Walter Brennan, Mary Brian, Lyle Talbot, Frank Shields, and Frank Melton. The plot is about a captain who returns home from a long voyage and has to take charge of his business and family.

Plot 
Cappy Ricks (Walter Brennan) has returned home from a long voyage at sea only to find that his family and business are not as he left them.  His daughter Frankie (Mary Brian) is engaged to a dimwit that he isn't fond of.  His future mother-in-law already owns 51% of his business and has plans to replace his prized ship.  A marriage date is set for his daughter.  The business is to be merged with his long standing competitor.  Cappy Ricks knows he has to end the chaos and set things straight.  He brings everyone on his ship as there he can be the Captain and in charge.  He has a two day excursion extend into an 8 week voyage.  Then they are lost on an uninhabited island.  And as in other movies of that period, he uses the island to straighten out the arrogance of the rich ladies and the weakness of sons under mothers dominance.  They were never lost for he had secret radio contact.  Captain Braddock "rescues" them but his modern electronic ship fails in a storm and only Cappy knows how to sail.  The merger is cancelled, Mrs. Peasely is to move from his house, and his daughter is to marry the man she really loves all with a happy ending.

Cast 
Walter Brennan as Cappy Ricks
Mary Brian as Frances 'Frankie' Ricks
Lyle Talbot as Bill Peck
Frank Shields as Waldo P. Bottomly Jr.
Frank Melton as Matt Peasely
Georgia Caine as Mrs. Amanda Peasely
Phyllis Barry as Ellen Ricks Peasely
William B. Davidson as Waldo P. Bottomly Sr.
Frank Shannon as Captain Braddock
Howard Brooks as Revere the Butler

Release 
The Republic Pictures film was released May 24, 1937.

On April 25, 2021, the film was screened in its entirety as an online pre-show attraction for one of the dueling streams that comprised the On Cinema Eighth Annual Oscar Special. It had been previously featured in the fifth episode of the 11th season of On Cinema.

References

External links 

1937 films
1937 comedy-drama films
American black-and-white films
Republic Pictures films
American comedy-drama films
Films directed by Ralph Staub
1930s English-language films
1930s American films